The 2022–23 Serie A (known as the Serie A TIM for sponsorship reasons) is the 121st season of top-tier Italian football, the 91st in a round-robin tournament, and the 13th since its organization under an own league committee, the Lega Serie A. AC Milan are the defending champions.

Summary
Starting from the 2022–23 season, should the first and second, or 17th and 18th-placed teams at the end of the season be tied on points, a play-off tiebreaker match will be held at a neutral site to determine the title and final team relegated respectively. The tiebreaker will not have extra time, and will instead directly go to a penalty shoot-out should the two teams be tied after 90 minutes. This is the first time play-offs have been used since the 2004–05 campaign.

Lega Serie A had initially planned to run a tournament featuring Serie A teams in the United States during the 2022 FIFA World Cup, but this was later cancelled.

In January 2023, Juventus were deducted 15 points as punishment for capital gain violations. The decision is subject to appeal.

Teams
Cagliari were relegated after six years in the top flight, Genoa relegated to second level after 15 years, and Venezia relegated after only one year in the top flight. They were replaced by Lecce, Serie B champions, Cremonese, Serie B runners-up, and Monza, Serie B playoff winners. Lecce returned to top flight after 2 years of absence, whilst Cremonese returned after 26 years of absence and Monza were promoted to Serie A for the first time in the club's history.

Stadiums and locations

Number of teams by region

Personnel and kits

Managerial changes

League table

Positions by round
The table lists the positions of teams after each week of matches. In order to preserve chronological evolvements, any postponed matches are not included to the round at which they were originally scheduled, but added to the full round that were played immediately afterwards.

Results

Season statistics

Top goalscorers

Hat-tricks

Notes
(H) – Home team(A) – Away team

Top assists

Clean sheets

Awards

Monthly awards

References

External links

Official website
Serie A at ESPN.com

Serie A seasons
Italy
1
Italy